Long Akah (also known as Long Aka) is an old settlement in the interior of the Telang Usan district of Sarawak, Malaysia, on the upper reaches of the Baram river.

The village is an old Chinese trading post, about ten minutes downstream by boat from Long San.

It is the site of an old Fort built in 1929 as an administrative centre in Charles Vyner Brooke’s era. The structural timber in the two-storey fort is the very hard Ironwood (local name Kayu Belian) and it has undergone some refurbishment, including replacing the timber roof tiles with zinc roofing.

Neighbouring settlements include:

Transportation
Long Akah Airport is a STOL airfield, providing access to this remote village from Miri and Marudi.

References

Telang Usan District
Villages in Sarawak